Wanita Dokish (April 6, 1936 – September 28, 2016) was an All-American Girls Professional Baseball League player. Listed at 5' 5", 125 lb., she was a switch-hitter and threw right-handed.

Dokish joined the league in its last season of 1954 and did not have much of a chance to play.

Born in Van Meter, Pennsylvania, Dokish recalled playing baseball at six years of age. But it was not until she was 14 and enrolled at high school, where she had the opportunity to play organized softball.

Dokish attended an AAGPBL tryout at Battle Creek, Michigan, and signed a contract to play for the Rockford Peaches. She hit a single in her first at bat, but was used sparingly after her league debut.

In a 27-game career, Dokish posted a batting average of .113 (5-for-44) with  two RBI and five runs scored.

After baseball, Dokish worked at the Westinghouse Electric Corporation based in Pennsylvania. She also continued playing softball until 1974, when she developed leg problems.

The AAGPBL folded in 1954, but there is a permanent display at the Baseball Hall of Fame and Museum at Cooperstown, New York since November 5, 1988, that honors the entire league rather than any individual figure. Dokish was present during the ceremony.

Wanita Dokish died in 2016 in North Huntingdon, Pennsylvania, at the age of 80.

Career statistics
Batting

Fielding

References

1936 births
2016 deaths
All-American Girls Professional Baseball League players
Rockford Peaches players
Baseball players from Pennsylvania
People from Westmoreland County, Pennsylvania
21st-century American women